Chandanda Nikkin Thimmaiah (born 18 January 1991) is an Indian field hockey player who plays as a forward. He was named in the Indian squad for the 2016 Summer Olympics.

References

External links
Player profile at Hockey India

1991 births
Living people
People from Kodagu district
Indian male field hockey players
Field hockey players from Karnataka
Field hockey players at the 2014 Commonwealth Games
Field hockey players at the 2014 Asian Games
Field hockey players at the 2016 Summer Olympics
Olympic field hockey players of India
Commonwealth Games medallists in field hockey
Commonwealth Games silver medallists for India
Asian Games gold medalists for India
Medalists at the 2014 Asian Games
Asian Games medalists in field hockey
Medallists at the 2014 Commonwealth Games